The tailfin era of automobile styling encompassed the 1950s and 1960s, peaking between 1955 and 1961. It was a style that spread worldwide, as car designers picked up styling trends from the US automobile industry, where it was regarded as the "golden age" of American auto design and American exceptionalism.

General Motors design chief Harley Earl is often credited for the automobile tailfin, introducing small fins on the 1948 Cadillac, but according to many sources the actual inventor/designer of the tailfin for the 1948 Cadillac was Franklin Quick Hershey, who at the time the 1948 Cadillac was being designed was chief of the GM Special Car Design Studio. It was Hershey who, after seeing an early production model of a P-38 at Selfridge Air Base, thought the twin rudders of the airplane would make a sleek design addition to the rear of future modern automobiles.  Tailfins took particular hold on the automotive buying public’s imagination as a result of Chrysler designer Virgil Exner’s Forward Look, which subsequently resulted in manufacturers scrambling to install larger and larger tailfins onto new models. As jet-powered aircraft, rockets, and space flight gained public recognition through the Space Race, the automotive tailfin assemblies (including tail lights) were designed to resemble more and more the tailfin and engine sections of contemporary jet fighters and space rockets.

Plymouth claimed that the tailfins were not fins, but "stabilizers" to place the "center of pressure" as far to the rear as possible and thus "reduce by 20% the needs for steering correction in a cross wind", while Mercedes-Benz called its own tailfins , sight lines that ostensibly aided in backing up.

Background
Automobile engineer Paul Jaray added a center fin to his prototype designs in the 1920s for aerodynamic stability. Influenced by his patents some car producers made streamlined prototypes with one center positioned tailfin. For example, the Audi F5 Stromliner prototype, Kdf-Wagen prototype, Tatra T77 production car or Fiat Padovan prototype.
	
Some sub-models of the 1937 Cadillac Fleetwood, which predates the P-38, also contained hints of tailfins via projecting tail-light "paddles", although it is unclear if this influenced later fin designs. The 1941 Cadillac Series 63 4-Door Sedan also had a form of jutting tail-lights, although milder than the 1937 Fleetwood. Even though the 1948 model was the first conscious effort at fins, the earlier partial occurrences may have made the concept more acceptable to consumers and designers. (World War II produced a gap of Cadillac model production between the early 1940s and late 1940s as factories turned to military goods production, interrupting the development of the fin concept.)

Tailfin era
The Cadillac 1948 fin styling proved popular, and its use spread to other models in the General Motors family of brands. Soon it was adopted by other manufacturers, with top Chrysler stylist Virgil Exner in particular taking the tailfin look on board. As confidence grew in the styling trend, the fins grew larger and bolder.

The most extreme tailfins appeared in the late 1950s, such as on the 1959 Cadillac Eldorado and the 1959 Imperial Crown sedan. The 1959 Cadillac fins looked like jet airplane vertical stabilizers with sharp points and twin bullet-shaped  taillights. Many of automotive press and much of the public were getting weary of the exaggerated tailfins, and the manufacturers were ready to phase them out because they added cost and complexity to design and manufacturing. Tailfins descended throughout the early 1960s, even adopting a downward slope on the 1965 Cadillacs. Mostly they disappeared and were replaced with a new style of taillight, called lobster-claw taillights, although in instances a sharp-edged quarter panel meeting a downward sloping trunk created the illusion of fins. Vestigial tailfins, however, remained on American cars into the 1990s, at least as far as the 1999 Cadillac Deville.

Mercedes-Benz introduced a modest tailfin on its 1959 W111 series of sedans, which gained the nickname "Fintails". In 1997, Lancia introduced the Lancia Kappa Coupé with similar rear "sight line" augmentation.

Safety issues

Tailfins have been criticized as a safety concern, even as a parked vehicle.  In Kahn v. Chrysler (1963), a seven-year-old child on a bicycle collided with a fin and sustained a head injury. A case of the same era, Hatch v. Ford (1958), is also prominent in the study of personal injury from parked vehicles.  In both of these cases, children were injured by sharp protrusions on parked cars. The plaintiffs lost in both cases. In "Kahn", the court found that Chrysler was not responsible for anticipating "all the possible ways in which a person may injure himself by falling against an automobile." In "Hatch", the plaintiff attempted to rely on a law governing the size and protrusion of radiator caps and grills, which the court said did not apply to tailfins.

Legacy
Examples of tailfin styling:
Auto Union 1000 Sp 1958–1965
Buick LeSabre, 1959–1963
Buick Roadmaster, 1955–1958
Buick Electra, 1959–1960
Cadillac Deville, 1959–1964
Cadillac Eldorado, 1948–1964
Chevrolet Bel Air, 1955–1960
Chevrolet Impala, 1958–1960
Chrysler New Yorker, 1957–1964
Chrysler Valiant, 1962
Chrysler Windsor, 1956–1960
Cisitalia 1947
DeSoto Adventurer, 1957–1960
DeSoto Fireflite, 1956–1960
Dodge Dart, 1960–1961
Dodge Lancer, 1955–1959
Edsel (all models), 1958–1960
Facel Vega FVS
Facel Vega Excellence
Facel Vega Facel II
Fiat 2100, 1959–1961
Ford Anglia (105e), 1959–1968
Ford Consul, 1951–1962
Ford Fairlane, 1957–1963
Ford Galaxie, 1959–1961
Ford Thunderbird, 1957–1963
Ford Zephyr, 1951–1966
Holden FB & EK, 1960–1962
Imperial, 1955–1961
Lincoln Capri, 1955–1957
Lincoln Continental, 1957–1960
Mercedes-Benz Fintail, 1959–1968
Mercury Comet, 1960–1964
Mercury Meteor, 1961–1963
Mercury Monterey, 1957–1964
Mercury Park Lane, 1959–1960
Mercury Turnpike Cruiser, 1957–1958
Morris Major (Series II & Elite,) 1959–1964
Morris Oxford Farina, 1959–1971
Moskvitch 402 – Moskvitch 407, 1956–1965
Moskvitch 408 – Moskvitch 412, 1964–1976
Nissan Cedric, 1960-1965
Oldsmobile 98 – Oldsmobile 88, 1957–1959
Opel Kapitän, 1958–1963
Packard Caribbean, 1955-1958
Packard Clipper, 1955-1958
Packard Patrician, 1953-1958
Peugeot 404, 1960–1975
Plymouth Fury, 1956–1960
Plymouth Valiant, 1960–1962
Pontiac Star Chief, 1959–1960
Pontiac Catalina, 1959–1960
Saab 95, 1959-1978
Škoda Octavia, 1959–1971
Studebaker-Packard Hawk series, 1957–1961
Studebaker President, 1957–1958
Studebaker Commander, 1958
Sunbeam Alpine, 1959–1968
Triumph Herald, 1959-1971
Toyota Corona, 1960-1964
Toyota Crown, 1955-1962
Trabant, 1957-1991
Vauxhall Cresta PA, 1957–1962
Volvo P1800
ZIL-111, 1959–1962

Subtle reintroduction into car styling 
In 1999 Cadillac launched the Cadillac Evoq concept to lead the marque’s new design language, known as Art and Science. Recent Cadillacs have continued the tradition of the brand's signature vertical taillamp tailfins. Cadillac's designers call the current Cadillacs's styling evocative of tailfins. In 2010, the Cadillac SRX styling incorporated the trademark vertical taillights sculpted into tiny tailfins projecting from the rear. This was also done with the Cadillac XTS, which launched in 2012, and with many other models in later years.

The 2000-2005 Buick LeSabre's rear styling included subtle delta fins as a homage to the early LeSabres.

In 2009 Trabant introduced the Nt concept with distinct tail fins projecting from the rear similar to the earlier models made the Trabant company.

The Chrysler 300 from 2011 to the present has subtle, but noticeable tailfins.  

Though not officially mentioned by the manufacturer, reviews from the media compared the sharp angles of the fourth generation Toyota Prius tail-lights similar to tailfins. This is better seen when the tail-lights are lit.

See also 
 1950s American automobile culture
 Googie architecture
 Empennage
 Spoiler, sides of which may resemble tailfins

Notes 

Automotive body parts
Automotive styling features
1950s fads and trends
American inventions